Grant Koontz (born January 28, 1994) is an American road and track cyclist.

Major results

Track
2019
 1st  Team pursuit, National Track Championships
2021
 1st  Team pursuit, National Track Championships
2022
 1st  Scratch race, Pan American Track Championships
 National Track Championships
1st  Scratch race
1st  Points race
1st  Omnium

Road
2017
 2nd Overall Hotter'N Hell Hundred
1st Stage 3
2019
 1st  Points classification, Joe Martin Stage Race

References

External links

1994 births
Living people
American male cyclists
American track cyclists
Sportspeople from Houston
Cyclists from Texas